Norway was represented by Lars A. Fredriksen, with the song "Alltid sommer", at the 1998 Eurovision Song Contest, which took place on 9 May in Birmingham. "Alltid sommer" was chosen as the Norwegian entry at the Melodi Grand Prix on 28 February and, unusually, was performed in English ("All I Ever Wanted Was You") at MGP although language rules in 1998 still required the song to be performed in Norwegian in Birmingham.

Before Eurovision

Melodi Grand Prix 1998 
Melodi Grand Prix 1998 was the Norwegian national final that selected Norway's entry for the Eurovision Song Contest 1998.

Competing entries 
Composers were directly invited by NRK to submit songs for the competition. The composers both created the song and selected the performer for their entry. Among the competing artists, Elisabeth Andreassen was bidding for a record-breaking fifth appearance at Eurovision.

Final 
The final took place on 28 February 1998 at the Studio 2 of NRK, hosted by Øystein Bache and Rune Gokstad. The winner was selected by a combination of regional televoting and a jury panel. The results of the public televote were revealed by Norway's five regions, with the televoting figures of each region being converted to points. The top six songs received 1, 2, 3, 5, 7 and 10 points. The jury panel had a weighting equal to the votes of two televoting regions. The jury consisted of Ellen Foss-Sørensen, Tor Milde, Finn Bjelke, Olve Brekke, Stein Dag Jensen and Silje Stang.

At Eurovision 
Heading into the final of the contest, BBC reported that bookmakers ranked the entry joint 12th out of the 25 entries. "All I Ever Wanted Was You" was translated to "Alltid sommer" for Eurovision. On the night of the final Fredriksen performed 22nd in the running order, following Finland and preceding Estonia. At the close of voting "Alltid sommer" had received 79 points, placing Norway 8th of the 25 entries. The Norwegian televoting awarded its 12 points to Malta.

Voting

References 

1998
Countries in the Eurovision Song Contest 1998
1998
Eurovision
Eurovision